George John LaHood (born January 22, 1979) is an American politician from Georgia. LaHood is a Republican member of Georgia House of Representatives for District 175.

References

Republican Party members of the Georgia House of Representatives
21st-century American politicians
Living people
1979 births